aka Top Secrets of Women Torture and Top Secret of Torturing Women is a 1968 Japanese Pink film in the ero guro style directed by Kiyoshi Komori aka Haku Komori. The film features future Nikkatsu SM-queen Naomi Tani in a role during the first half of her career, working outside of the large studio system.

Synopsis
Set in the Edo Era, the film opens with a group of women being convicted of various crimes. The rest of the film is given to graphic depiction of the tortures the women endure as part of their sentences.

Cast
 Koji Satomi
 Naomi Tani
 Kemi Ichiboshi
 Reiko Ōzuki (大月麗子)
 Midori Hinoki (檜みどり)
 瀬黒 ユリ
 Kaoru Miya (美矢 かほる)

Kiyoshi Komori
Born about 1920, Kiyoshi Komori began directing in 1953, and concentrated on war films and comedies during the first decade of his career. He made his first pink film-- Japan Torture Punishment History—in 1964, and used torture as a central theme in his pink oeuvre from that point on. Absolutely Secret: Girl Torture, along with Snake Lust (1967) is one of Komori's most notorious works. He retired from filmmaking in the mid-1970s.

Critical reception
In their Japanese Cinema Encyclopedia: The Sex Films, the Weissers assert that the film was inspired by ero guro master, Teruo Ishii's Joys of Torture series. However the first entry in that series, Joys of Torture: Tokugawa History Women Punishment, opened in May 1968, the month after the premier of Absolutely Secret: Girl Torture. Of the film, the Weissers write, "This motion picture is sado-exploitation at its worst (best?)... long before Nikkatsu made it hip." They judge Komori's pink thriller Ten Years Of Evil to be a better film, and note, comparing Komori to two more prominent directors of the genre, "... don't expect the intricate plots usually associated with the similar Ishii productions, nor the exquisite cinematography of the Wakamatsu films."

References

External links

English

Japanese
 

1968 films
1960s Japanese-language films
Pink films
Shintōhō Eiga films
1960s pornographic films
Films set in the Edo period
1960s Japanese films